Manulea is a genus of moths in the family Erebidae erected by Hans Daniel Johan Wallengren in 1863. The type species is Lithosia gilveola Ochsenheimer, 1810 (=palliatella Scopoli, 1763).

Species
Subgenus Manulea Wallengren, 1863
complana species group
Manulea complana (Linnaeus, 1758)
Manulea costalis (Zeller, 1847) (=morosina Herrich-Schäffer, [1847])
Manulea palliatella (Scopoli, 1763) (=unita [Denis & Schiffermüller], 1775)
Manulea pseudocomplana (Daniel, 1939)

lutarella species group
Manulea lutarella (Linnaeus, 1758)
Manulea flavociliata (Lederer, 1853)

minor species group
Manulea minor (Okano, 1955)
Manulea pseudofumidisca Dubatolov & Zolotuhin, 2011

pygmaeola species group
Manulea affineola (Bremer, 1864)
Manulea fuscodorsalis (Matsumura, 1930)
Manulea japonica (Leech, [1889])
Manulea kansuensis (Hering, 1936)
Manulea minima (Daniel, 1954)
Manulea nankingica (Daniel, 1954)
Manulea omelkoi Dubatolov & Zolotuhin, 2011
Manulea predotae (Schawerda, 1927)
Manulea pygmaeola (Doubleday, 1847)
Manulea ussurica (Daniel, 1954)
Manulea uniformeola (Daniel, 1954)
Manulea wiltshirei (Tams, 1939)

Subgenus Setema de Freina & Witt, 1980
Manulea atratula (Eversmann, 1847)
Manulea bicolor (Grote, 1864)
Manulea cereola (Hübner, [1803])
Manulea debilis (Staudinger, 1887)
Manulea hyalinofuscatum (Tshistjakov, 1990)
Manulea nigrocollare (Tshistjakov, 1990)
Manulea vakulenkoi (Tshistjakov, 1990)

Subgenus Agenjoa Dubatolov & Zolotuhin, 2011
Manulea hunanica (Daniel, 1954)
Manulea lurideola (Zincken, 1817)

Incorrectly placed 
Manulea replana (Lewin, 1805)

References 

 
 

Lithosiina
Moth genera